Johnny, We Hardly Knew Ye or Johnny, I Hardly Knew Ye may refer to:
 Johnny I Hardly Knew Ye, traditional song
 Johnny We Hardly Knew Ye (book), 1972 memoir about John F. Kennedy

See also
 Assassination of John F. Kennedy